Rio Pomba is a municipality in the Brazilian state of Minas Gerais founded on 25 December 1767. The population is 17,959 (2020 est.) in an area of 252 km². The municipality is located at a mean elevation of 441 m.

Notable people
Alisson Football player

See also
 List of municipalities in Minas Gerais

References

1767 establishments in Brazil
Municipalities in Minas Gerais
Populated places established in 1767